The North Tamworth Bears are a rugby league team located in the suburb of North Tamworth, in Tamworth, New South Wales, Australia. They were formed in 1911, three years after Rugby league came to New South Wales, and are one of the oldest clubs in New South Wales, in particular in the Country. They play in the Group 4 Rugby League competition, which is administered by the New South Wales Country Rugby League. The North Tamworth Bears won the 2006 premiership beating the Coonabarabran Unicorns.

History
The North Tamworth Bears were formed in 1911 and were first known as the Rebels until 1947. They played their first game at No 1 Oval at 4:10 P.M. on 22 July 1911, which was also to be the first game of rugby league to be played in Tamworth. The team was made up of nearly the entire first grade North Tamworth Rugby Union team who switched codes. As the rebels they played in 14 grandfinals between 1911 and 1947 winning seven of these games.

From 1947 to 1955 the club were known as the Tri-colours and during this period the team played in four grandfinals, winning three.

1951– Won Clayton's cup awarded to most successful Country league team.

In 1956 the Tri-colours changed their name to the Bears which is currently their name. Between 1965 and 1967 the Bears established their own oval and facilities on Manilla Road. The oval and facilities were titled Jack Woolaston Oval in 1985 in commemoration of the founding President Jack Woolaston.

During the 1980s the bears played in two grandfinals winning the 1980 game, however losing the 1984 game.

The club's first grade team made the grandfinal two consecutive years in 2001, 2002 and also in 2003 however they lost all three matches. In 2005 the Bears won the Northern Division pre-season club championship, first grade major premiership, the minor premiership and the pre-Season Knockout.

Additionally the Reserve Grade and Under 18 teams won the minor premiership and both were grand finalists.

In 2006 the first grade team won the Northern Division pre-season club championship, the preseason Easter knockout competition, and were undefeated for the entire regular season. The Bears then won their second successive premiership against the Coonabarabran Unicorns at Jack Woolaston Oval. The reserve grade team also won the premiership.

2014 saw the Bears win the first grade premiership against the Gunnedah Bulldogs, a feat that earned them the Clayton Cup for the first time since 1951.

2000 Runners up 
2001 Runners up
2002 Runners up
2003 Runners up
2005 First grade premiers against West Tamworth Lions 34–28 
2005 the Bears won the Northern Division pre-season club championship, first grade major premiership, the minor premiership and the pre-Season Knockout. 
2006 First grade premiers against Coonabarabran Unicorns 42–14
2007 First grade premiers against West Tamworth Lions 32–12
2008 First grade premiers against West Tamworth Lions 8–6
2009 Runners up
2011 Runners up
2012 Runners up
2013 Runners up
2014 saw the Bears win the first grade premiership against the Gunnedah Bulldogs, a feat that earned them the Clayton Cup for the first time since 1951.
2015 first grade premiers against West Tamworth Lions 46–25
2016 first grade premiers against West Tamworth Lions 36–12
2017 first grade premiers against Narrabri Blues 30–22
2018 first grade premiers against Gunnedah Bulldogs 34–28
2019 first grade premiers against Kootingal Roosters 40–4 a feat that earned them the Clayton cup for the third time, earning the title along with 3 other CRL as the most successful clubs for country league. 
North Tamworth bears have won 6 successive grand finals 2019 undefeated.

Playing record 
Playing record compiled from scores published in the Rugby League Week.

Sources
 1 North Tamworth Bears History retrieved 14 July 2007

References

External links
http://northtamworthbears.leaguenet.com.au

Tamworth, New South Wales
New England (New South Wales)
Rugby league teams in New South Wales
Rugby clubs established in 1911
1911 establishments in Australia